(1+)-approximate nearest neighbor search is a variant of the nearest neighbor search problem. A solution to the (1+)-approximate nearest neighbor search is a point or multiple points within distance (1+)  from a query point, where  is the distance between the query point and its true nearest neighbor.

Reasons to approximate nearest neighbor search include the space and time costs of exact solutions in high-dimensional spaces (see curse of dimensionality) and that in some domains, finding an approximate nearest neighbor is an acceptable solution.

Approaches for solving (1+)-approximate nearest neighbor search include kd-trees, Locality Sensitive Hashing and brute force search.

References

Approximation algorithms
Classification algorithms
Search algorithms